Gyügye is a small village in Szabolcs-Szatmár-Bereg county, in the Northern Great Plain region of eastern Hungary.

Geography

Sightseeings
The old reformed church is worth visiting because of its beautiful and renowned coffered ceiling decorated in the church's inner space. The church was built in the 13th century in the romanesque style.

References
Bérczi Sz, Bérczi Zs., Bérczi K. (2002): Kazettás mennyezetek. (Coffered ceilings.) Licium-Art, Debrecen
Tombor I. (1968): Magyarországi festett famennyezetek és rokonemlékek a XV-XIX. századból. (Painted Coffered Ceilings from Hungary from the 15-16th Century.) Akadémiai K. Budapest
Balogh J. (1939): A késő-gótikus és a renaissance-kor művészete. (Art of the Late-Gothic and Renaissance Age in Hungary.) Magyar művelődéstörténet. 2. (Szerk. Domanovszky S., Ed.), Budapest

Outer links
Images of the church.
Details about the art of the church.
Article about the coffered ceiling of Gyügye.

Populated places in Szabolcs-Szatmár-Bereg County
Romanesque architecture in Hungary